

List of events

See also

 List of massacres
 Mass grave
 List of riots

Notes and references